The Fairchild 71 was an American high-wing monoplane passenger and cargo aircraft built by Fairchild Aircraft and later built in Canada by Fairchild Aircraft Ltd. (Canada) for both military and civilian use as a rugged bush plane.

Design and development
The Fairchild Aircraft Company undertook a progressive development of the Fairchild FC-2W2 light transport.  Its first improvement was the FC-2, whose several improvements included slightly swept-back wings; wingspan increased to 50 feet; engine power nearly doubled; and interior changes to improve passenger comfort.

The FC-2 first flew in 1926.

The FC-2W was a further development, featuring:
Camera bay for vertical aerial photography;
Low-cut aft windows for oblique aerial photography.

The FC-2 and FC-2W continued the use of fabric-covered welded steel tubing for fuselage and empennage construction, and strut-braced wooden-structure fabric-covered wings.

The FC-2W, later known as the Model 71, was built in the United States between 1928 and 1930.  In 1929 Fairchild formed a company in Canada (Fairchild Aircraft Limited) at Longueuil, Quebec in 1929 to support the Canadian operators of Fairchild aircraft. The Canadian company also set up a factory production line for the Model 71, developing a variant for the Canadian military. The Canadian-built aircraft differed from the US version in that all the passenger-comfort features were removed, and the craft were built specifically for aerial photography.

Operational history

The United States Army Air Service acquired one Model 71 for evaluation; it was designated XC-8, later redesignated XF-1 and used for photographic work.

Eight more service-test aircraft, designated YF-1 were ordered; all nine were later redesignated C-8.

The Royal Canadian Air Force (RCAF), another major military operator, evaluated the Fairchild 71 in mid-June 1930. Thirty four RCAF F-71s were operated from 1930 to 1946. Along with the earlier FC-2 series, the RCAF F-71 was utilized primarily in the aerial photographic survey role as well as northern transport. In November 1934, the RCAF transferred the FC-71s to the five detachments flying in the amalgamated Maritimes No. 5 (Flying Boat) Squadron at RCAF Station Dartmouth. The squadron flew the FC-71 extensively on anti-smuggling (rum running) and illegal immigration patrols for the Royal Canadian Mounted Police (RCMP).

Most of the Model 71 production ended up in the hands of bush plane operators in Canada and the United States. Civilian operators likewise found the 71 a rugged, reliable and highly useful utility transport, well suited for northern and remote operations.

Variants
Fairchild 71
Initial production variant
Fairchild 71A
Production variant with increased sweep on wings and improved interior
Fairchild 71C
Canadian-built version
Fairchild 71-CM
Canadian-built version with metal-skinned fuselage
Fairchild Super 71
Floatplane version with new fuselage and greater wingspan
Fairchild 51/71
Canadian-built version with wings of Model 51 and fuselage of Model 71

United States military designations

XC-8
One prototype Fairchild 71, later redesignated XF-1 when modified for photo survey.
XF-1
XC-8 redesignated for photo-survey
YF-1
Eight Fairchild 71 aircraft for evaluation with provision for seven passenger seats, later redesignated C-8.
F-1A
Production aircraft (Fairchild 71A), six built later redesignated C-8A.
C-8
YF-1 redesignated
C-8A
F-1A redesignated
J2Q-1
One Fairchild 71 for evaluation by the United States Navy, redesignated XR2Q-1.

Operators

Civilian Operators

Aerovias Centrales
Compañía Mexicana de Aviación
 
Clifford Ball Inc.
Pacific Alaska Airways
Pan American Airways
Pan American-Grace Airways

 California-Arabian Standard Oil Co.

Military operators

Royal Canadian Air Force

United States Army Air Corps
United States Navy

Specifications (Model 71C)

See also

References

Citations

Bibliography

 Donald, David, ed. The Encyclopedia of World Aircraft. Etobicoke, Ontario, Canada: Prospero Books, 1997. .
 Milberry, Larry. Aviation In Canada. Toronto: McGraw-Hill Ryerson Ltd., 1979. .
 Molson, Ken M. and Taylor, Harold A. Canadian Aircraft Since 1909. Stittsville, Ontario: Canada's Wings, Inc., 1982. .

External links

 RCAF.com: The Aircraft: Fairchild 71
 Antiques: Fairchild 71

1920s United States civil utility aircraft
71
High-wing aircraft
Single-engined tractor aircraft
Aircraft first flown in 1926